Stephen Williams (born 5 June 1961) is a former Australian rules footballer in the South Australian National Football League, playing for the Port Adelaide Magpies and is currently an assistant development coach at Port Adelaide Power and head coach of the Immanuel College first XVIII.

Early life 
Stephen Williams is the son of Port Adelaide legend Fos Williams, and younger brother of twins Mark and Anthony. Stephen Williams was originally listed with West Adelaide Football Club along with Mark and Anthony, where father Fos was coach, but Stephen did not play any senior games for West Adelaide. When Fos left West Adelaide, the Williams brothers moved to Port Adelaide in 1979.

Port Adelaide player 
Williams made his league debut for Port Adelaide in 1979. After playing only 16 games in his first 3 years, Williams played 19 senior games in 1982. However, Williams continued to be a fringe player up until (and including) 1986, playing a handful of games in the reserves each year.

In 1986, Williams was drafted by the Brisbane Bears at number 40 in the AFL national draft. Williams played 4 games for the Bears in 1987 (alongside brother Mark), and returned to the Port Adelaide Magpies in 1988. After his brief stint in the (then) VFL, Williams became a key player for Port Adelaide. Williams played in the Port premiership teams of 1988,89,90,92,94,95 and retired from playing at the end of the 1995 season. Williams was awarded life membership of the Port Adelaide Football Club in 1989 and was inducted into the South Australian Football Hall of Fame in 2016.

Port Adelaide SANFL coach 
In 1996, Williams was appointed assistant coach of Port Adelaide Magpies.  When coach John Cahill left mid-season to coach the newly formed Port Adelaide Power in the AFL, Williams took over as coach. Port Adelaide Magpies won the SANFL premiership in that year. Williams also coached Port Adelaide to premierships in 1998 and 1999.

Port Adelaide AFL assistant coach 
Williams left the Port Adelaide Magpies at the end of the 2003 season to take up a role at the Port Adelaide Power in the AFL, where brother Mark was coach. As of 2008, Williams is their Assistant Development Coach.

References 

Football Times - 1984 Year Book
Football Times - 1989 Year Book

External links 

Australian rules footballers from South Australia
Port Adelaide Football Club (SANFL) players
Brisbane Bears players
Port Adelaide Magpies coaches
Port Adelaide Football Club (SANFL) coaches
Port Adelaide Football Club players (all competitions)
South Australian State of Origin players
1961 births
Living people
South Australian Football Hall of Fame inductees
People educated at Immanuel College, Adelaide
Stephen